Ghana took part in the 2022 Commonwealth Games in Birmingham, England between 28 July and 8 August 2022. It was Ghana's seventeenth appearance at the Games.

Medalists

Competitors
Ghana received a quota of 40 open allocation slots from Commonwealth Sport. This quota is used to determine the overall team in sports lacking a qualifying system.

The following is the list of number of competitors participating at the Games per sport/discipline.

Notes

Athletics

A squad of fourteen athletes was selected on 14 June 2022. Among those selected is 2014 Youth Olympic 800 metres champion Martha Bissah, who until recently was indefinitely banned from representing Ghana as punishment for accusing the GAA of extortion.

Men
Track and road events

Women
Track and road events

Field events

Badminton

Singles

Doubles

Beach volleyball

On 28 March 2022, Ghana qualified for the women's tournament. This was achieved by winning the African Qualifier in Accra.

Women's tournament
Group A

Boxing

A squad of nine boxers was selected as of 21 June 2022.

Men

Women

Cycling

Road
Men

Track
Sprint

Time trial

Hockey

By virtue of its position in the FIH World Rankings for men and women respectively (as of 1 February 2022), Ghana qualified for both tournaments.

Detailed fixtures were released on 9 March 2022.

Summary

Men's tournament

Roster

Alfred Ntiamoah
Charles Abbiw
Elikem Akaba
Derick Owusu Lee
Christopher Dogbe
Eugene Acheampong
Emmanuel Ankomah
Mohammed Osumanu
Matthew Damalie
Samuel Afari
Francis Tettey
Michael Baiden
Duisberg Offei
Richard Adjei
Kwofie Benjamin
Luke Damalie
Emmanuel Akaba
Samuel Agbeli

Group play

Ninth place match

Women's tournament

Roster

Ernestina Coffie
Dede Okine
Vivian Narkuor
Serwaa Baah
Roberta Sarfo
Racheal Bamfo
Nafisatu Umaru
Mavis Berko
Martha Sarfoa
Lydia Afriyie
Hagiet Copson
Elizabeth Opoku
Cecilia Amoako
Doris Antwi
Bridget Azumah
Adizatu Sulemana
Abigail Boye
Eleanor Otoo

Group play

Ninth place match

Judo

Men

Para powerlifting

Squash

Swimming

Men

Women

Table tennis

Singles

Doubles

Team

Triathlon

Two triathletes have been selected to represent Ghana in Birmingham.

Individual

Weightlifting

Two weightlifters qualified for the competition by virtue of their positions in the IWF Commonwealth Ranking List.

See also
Ghana at the 2022 Winter Olympics

References

External links
Ghana Olympic Committee Official site

Nations at the 2022 Commonwealth Games
Ghana at the Commonwealth Games
2022 in Ghanaian sport